John Walton Capstick OBE (31 August 1858 – 27 April 1937) was a Bursar of Trinity College, Cambridge.

Early life
Capstick was born in Lancaster, Lancashire and educated at the Friends' School, Lancaster, and Owens College, Manchester. He took a teaching post at the University of Dundee and entered Trinity as a sub-sizar in 1888. He was elected to sizarship in 1889 and to a scholarship in 1890.

He is buried in the Parish of the Ascension Burial Ground in Cambridge, with his wife Edith Capstick.

References

External links
 
 Trinity College Chapel

1858 births
1937 deaths
Officers of the Order of the British Empire
Fellows of Trinity College, Cambridge